The Toyota Probox is a 5-door, 2- or 4-seater passenger car (Probox Wagon) and light commercial van (Probox Van) produced by the Japanese automaker Toyota since July 2002. It replaced the Corolla/Sprinter van and served as a slightly shorter version of the now-discontinued Toyota Succeed.

The Probox has been a commercial success that has ensured stable sales for 20 years despite using the same model since 2002.

First generation (XP50/XP160; 2002) 
The Toyota Probox was created as a new type of commercial van in July 2002.

Until 2008, the Probox and its "brother model" Succeed sold a total of 70,000 to 90,000 units a year. Since 2008, the model has maintained the sales of about 50,000 units per year.

2014 facelift 
The Probox received a redesign, which was published on August 6, 2014, and the sales began on September 1 of the same year. The redesign was announced alongside the redesign of the Succeed. The new version is powered by a 1NR-FE engine.

Starting in 2018, a rebadged version of the Probox has been offered in Japan as the Mazda Familia Van.

Although the Succeed was discontinued in 2020, the Probox continued stable sales, selling 48,000 units in 2021.

Foreign use 
The Probox is used with a left-hand drive conversion extensively as a taxi in Peru and Bolivia. It remains in the JDM right-hand drive orientation for Jamaica. Right-hand-drive Proboxes are used in Myanmar despite the country's traffic being oriented on the right.

The car is not officially supplied to Russia, therefore it is distributed mainly in Siberia and the Far East of Russia (in the right-hand drive version).

Gallery 
Toyota Probox

Mazda Familia Van

References

External links

 
 (Mazda Familia Van) 
Modifications Toyota Probox

Probox
Cars introduced in 2002

2010s cars
Station wagons